Affonso Giaffone Neto (born April 6, 1968 in Santos, São Paulo, Brazil) is a Brazilian former racing driver. He is one of several racing drivers in his family; he is a cousin of Felipe Giaffone, and a cousin-in-law of Rubens Barrichello. His father Affonso Giaffone Jr. was also a racing driver.

Giaffone raced in the 1996–1997 Indy Racing League season with eight career starts, including the 1997 Indianapolis 500.  His best career finish was in fourth position at Charlotte Motor Speedway in 1997. Before the IRL he finished third in the 1995 Indy Lights championship behind Greg Moore and Robbie Buhl. He was the 1991 Formula Three Sudamericana Champion with five victories.

Motorsports Career Results

American open–wheel racing results
(key)

Indy Lights

Indy Racing League

References

1968 births
Living people
Sportspeople from Santos, São Paulo
IndyCar Series drivers
Brazilian IndyCar Series drivers
Indianapolis 500 drivers
Indy Lights drivers
Stock Car Brasil drivers
Brazilian racing drivers
Formula 3 Sudamericana drivers